Xhafa or Xhafaj may refer to:

XHAFA-FM, a radio station in Veracruz, Mexico
Xhafa (surname)
Zik-Xhafaj, a locality in Albania